Lake Minneola High School (LMHS) is located in Minneola, Florida, United States. It is a public high school that serves grades 9–12.

Established in 2011, Lake Minneola High School is one of seven high schools in Lake County, and one of the first in Central Florida to implement an iPad-based education. It was built to alleviate overflow of sister schools South Lake High School and East Ridge High School.

Sports
Baseball
Basketball
Cheerleading
Cross country
Football
Golf
Lacrosse
Soccer
Softball
Swimming
Tennis
Track and field
Volleyball
Weightlifting

Notable alumni
Drew Mendoza - MLB Baseball Player    (Washington Nationals)

Performing arts
The Lake Minneola Music Department sent the Winter Percussion and Winter Colorguard programs to State Championships in Daytona with the percussion program receiving the school's first state title, placing first in Class 2A, with the guard program placing fifth in Class 2A.

In March 2018, the LMHS thespian troupe attended the Florida State Thespian Competition and received top rankings in the monologue and large group categories. The troupe also took their first one-act play to the state competition.

References

Public high schools in Florida
High schools in Lake County, Florida
Educational institutions established in 2011
2011 establishments in Florida